Slovenian Spirit was the name of a subsidiary of the now-defunct Austrian airline Styrian Spirit.

Services 

Slovenian Spirit operated flights on the Styrian Spirit network connecting Maribor Airport in Slovenia with Salzburg in Austria, and Paris. The airline suspended services in March 2006.

References

Defunct airlines of Slovenia
Airlines established in 2002
Airlines disestablished in 2006
2002 establishments in Austria
2006 disestablishments in Slovenia
Slovenian companies established in 2002